The Salem City School District is a comprehensive community public school district that serves students in pre-kindergarten through twelfth grade from Salem City, in Salem County, New Jersey, United States. The district is one of 31 former Abbott districts statewide that were established pursuant to the decision by the New Jersey Supreme Court in Abbott v. Burke which are now referred to as "SDA Districts" based on the requirement for the state to cover all costs for school building and renovation projects in these districts under the supervision of the New Jersey Schools Development Authority.

Public school students from Elsinboro, Lower Alloways Creek Township, Mannington Township and Quinton Township attend the district's high school for grades 9-12 as part of sending/receiving relationships.

The district participates in the Interdistrict Public School Choice Program, having been approved on November 2, 1999, as one of the first ten districts statewide to participate in the program. Seats in the program for non-resident students are specified by the district and are allocated by lottery, with tuition paid for participating students by the New Jersey Department of Education.

As of the 2021–22 school year, the district, comprised of three schools, had an enrollment of 1,226 students and 99.0 classroom teachers (on an FTE basis), for a student–teacher ratio of 12.4:1.

The district is classified by the New Jersey Department of Education as being in District Factor Group "A", the lowest of eight groupings. District Factor Groups organize districts statewide to allow comparison by common socioeconomic characteristics of the local districts. From lowest socioeconomic status to highest, the categories are A, B, CD, DE, FG, GH, I and J.

Schools
Schools in the district (with 2021–22 enrollment data from the National Center for Education Statistics) are:
Elementary school
John Fenwick Academy with 358 students in grades PreK-2
Syeda L. Carter, Principal
Middle school
Salem Middle School with 444 students in grades 3-8
Pascale E. DeVilmé, Principal
High school
Salem High School with 399 students in grades 9-12
John Mulhorn, Principal

Administration
Core members of the district's administration are:
Dr. Amiot Patrick Michel, Superintendent
Herbert Schectman, Business Administrator / Board Secretary

Board of education
The district's board of education is comprised of nine members who set policy and oversee the fiscal and educational operation of the district through its administration; Each of the sending districts have an appointed member who serves on the board. As a Type II school district, the board's trustees are elected directly by voters to serve three-year terms of office on a staggered basis, with three seats up for election each year held (since 2013) as part of the November general election. The board appoints a superintendent to oversee the district's day-to-day operations and a business administrator to supervise the business functions of the district.

References

External links
Salem City School District

School Data for the Salem City School District, National Center for Education Statistics

Salem, New Jersey
New Jersey Abbott Districts
New Jersey District Factor Group A
School districts in Salem County, New Jersey